Enteromius trispiloides is a species of ray-finned fish in the genus Enteromius which is endemic toonly known from a single specimen collected in the River Mano in Liberia.

Footnotes 

 

Enteromius
Taxa named by Christian Lévêque
Taxa named by Guy G. Teugels
Taxa named by Thys van den Audenaerde
Fish described in 1987